Hybrid plasmid is a plasmid that contains an inserted piece of foreign DNA.

References

Plasmids